"Motherboy XXX" is the 13th episode of the second season of the American television sitcom Arrested Development. It originally aired on the Fox network in the United States on March 13, 2005. The episode, directed by Joe Russo, was written by producer Jim Vallely and series creator and executive producer Mitchell Hurwitz.

The episode received mostly positive reviews from critics.

Plot 
Lucille approaches Michael, asking him to be her partner to “Motherboy”, an annual mother-son dinner dance. In every year prior, she went with Buster, but is embarrassed that he now has only one hand. Michael refuses to go with her. Meanwhile, George Michael is getting ready to go on a Christian camping trip with his girlfriend. Upon hearing this, Michael tells him not to go, and to instead visit Buster. Gob speaks with Michael about planning his divorce to his wife, who he married on a dare and barely remembers. He learns that the seal who bit off Buster’s hand (owned by Gob’s wife) had a tracking device on it. He and Michael decide to go after it, to try and recover Buster’s hand for a transplant.

Tobias meets with Carl Weathers at a Burger King, speaking about a project Carl is working on, which is about George Sr.’s escape from jail. He tells Tobias that in order to be in the episode, he needs to sign a release for the family. Later, George Michael meets Buster, per his father’s request. While there, Lucille offers to take him out of town to the camping trip, which he complies with. He soon learns that she is instead taking him to the Motherboy event. Having signed away his family’s life rights for the role of George Sr., Tobias begins research for the part. He sees George Sr. in the Bluth’s attic, who threatens him not to tell anyone of his whereabouts. When he hears of the show, he asks Tobias to act manly in the role.

Gob, Michael, and Buster arrive at the port where the seal’s tracking device had gone, only to find that the seal had been eaten by a shark, which carried the tracking device to the port. Buster mentions to Michael that George Michael had gone to Motherboy, and they both agree that they have to ‘save’ him from the event. Gob meets with his lawyer Barry, who tells him to say in court that he never consummated his marriage. Barry then says: "I missed breakfast, so I'm on my way to Burger King," and then jumps over the shark on the pier.

Gob later meets with his wife and tells her that he plans to tell the court this, but they end up having sex. Michael and Buster stake out the Motherboy dance, looking for a chance to create a diversion and take George Michael home. They confront Lucille, and she takes on Buster as a dance partner when Michael leaves with his son. When Motherboy ends, Michael takes George Michael to the camping trip to see his girlfriend.

On the next Arrested Development... 
Gob argues his case in court that his marriage was never consummated, but his wife shows a recently taken picture of him next to her with his shirt pulled over his head. The judge says there’s no way to tell who it is, but Gob admits that it’s him, causing his lawyer to leave the room.

Jumping the shark

Henry Winkler notes that Barry's "hopping" over the shark on the pier is a reference to the phrase Jumping the shark, which was coined by Jon Hein in response to Season Five, Episode 3, "Hollywood: Part 3" of the sitcom Happy Days (19741984), when his character Fonzie jumps over a shark while on water-skis. Winkler notes that he is "the only actor, maybe in the world, that has jumped the shark twice — once on Happy Days, and once on Arrested Development.”

Burger King promotion 
One of Fox's corporate sponsors was Burger King, who provided promotional consideration for Arrested Development. Carl Weathers informs Tobias that you can refill your drink for free at the restaurant, and Tobias calls it a "wonderful restaurant". A poster promoting the then-new Spicy Tendercrisp Chicken Sandwich can be seen in the background. The episode was originally named "The Tendercrisp Chicken Comedy Half Hour".

Reception

Critical reception 
The A.V. Club writer Noel Murray called the episode "one of the funniest and ballsiest episodes in the entire run of Arrested Development". In 2019, Vulture writer Brian Tallerico ranked the episode 6th out of the series' 84 episodes.

Accolades 
"Motherboy XXX" was nominated for Outstanding Single-Camera Picture Editing for a Comedy Series at the 57th Primetime Emmy Awards. In her role as Lucille, Jessica Walter was nominated for Outstanding Supporting Actress in a Comedy Series for her appearance in the episode.

References

External links
 

Arrested Development episodes
2005 American television episodes